Revolutionary Nuclei (RN; , Epanastatikoi Pyrines), also known as Revolutionary Cells, was an armed far-left political group in Greece. The group was responsible for or credibly suspected of committing twelve acts of terrorism between 1996–2000. Designated as terrorist group by the European Union and the United Kingdom.

Origins 
The Revolutionary Nuclei are thought to be the offshoot of a previous terrorist group known as the Revolutionary People's Struggle (ELA). The ELA dissolved in the early 1990s, and the Revolutionary Nuclei emerged in 1995 and remained heavily active through 2000. After a long hiatus, the group was credited with also carrying out an attack in 2009. This group opposed US military occupation and involvement in Greece. Both the Revolutionary Nuclei and its preceding Revolutionary People's Struggle were leftist groups. Both of these leftist terrorist groups opposed capitalism.

The prevalence of left-wing terrorist organizations in Greece is thought to be a backlash to the military rule that prevailed until 1974.

Claimed Attacks 
The 1996 attack on Citibank was the first incident credited to the Revolutionary Nuclei. The group was responsible for an attack on a government building in 1997. They were very active in 1998, with three separate incidents. One involved a government target, while the other two were attacks on businesses. The other two occurred on the same day at banks at two different locations.

In 1999, the group launched a deadly attack at the Intercontinental Hotel. Members of the Greek government were attending an Economic Round-table at the hotel. One other person was injured in the course of the attack. Later that same year, the group bombed the office of Texaco in Athens.

The group was most active in 2000, with five attacks occurring. The most notable aspect of these attacks was the use of time bombs. 12 November saw three attacks across the city of Athens. The Revolutionary Nuclei once again attacked a Barclays Bank and Citibank location. No injuries were reported, but damage was caused to the buildings. The third attack on that day was against an art studio, which resulted in property damage.

Weapons 
The Revolutionary Nuclei made exclusive use of bombs in their terrorist activities.

The group is responsible for one casualty and twelve instances of property damage.

References

Further reading 

 

Left-wing militant groups in Greece
Organizations formerly designated as terrorist by the United States
Politics of Greece
Organisations designated as terrorist by the European Union
Organisations designated as terrorist by the United Kingdom
Organizations based in Europe designated as terrorist
Defunct anarchist militant groups
Terrorism in Greece
Insurrectionary anarchism
Anarchist organizations in Greece